This is a list of adult fiction books that topped The New York Times Fiction Best Seller list in 1989.

See also

 1989 in literature
 New York Times Nonfiction Best Sellers of 1989
 Lists of The New York Times Fiction Best Sellers
 Publishers Weekly list of bestselling novels in the United States in the 1980s

References

1989
.
1989 in the United States